The 2015–16 CERS Cup was the 36th season of the CERS Cup, Europe's second club roller hockey competition organized by CERH. Thirty teams from seven national associations qualified for the competition as a result of their respective national league placing in the previous season.

Teams 
Thirty teams from seven national associations qualified for the competition.

Preliminary phase 
The preliminary phase legs took place on 24 October and 28 November 2015.

|}

Knockout phase

Final-Four
All times are Western European Time.

Semi-finals

Final

References

External links
 CERH website
  Roller Hockey links worldwide
  Mundook-World Roller Hockey

World Skate Europe Cup
CERS Cup
CERS Cup